The Harvard Museum of Natural History (HMNH) is a natural history museum housed in the University Museum Building, located on the campus of Harvard University in Cambridge, Massachusetts. It features 16 galleries with 12,000 specimens drawn from the collections of the University's three natural history research museums: the Harvard University Herbaria, the Museum of Comparative Zoology, and the Harvard Mineralogical Museum.

The museum is physically connected to the Peabody Museum of Archaeology and Ethnology at 26 Oxford Street. One admission grants visitors access to both museums. In 2012, Harvard formed a new consortium, the Harvard Museums of Science and Culture, whose members are the Harvard Museum of Natural History, the Harvard Museum of the Ancient Near East, the Peabody Museum, and the Collection of Historical Scientific Instruments.

History
The Harvard Museum of Natural History was created in 1998 as the "public face" of three research museums—the Museum of Comparative Zoology, the Harvard Mineralogical and Geological Museum, and the Harvard University Herbaria. Its exhibitions draw on Harvard University's natural history collections. Harvard's research faculty provides expertise and programs for members and the general public provide an exchange of information and ideas. With more than 210,000 visitors in 2013, the Harvard Museum of Natural History is the university's most-visited museum.

Exhibits

In the museum's permanent galleries, visitors encounter the diversity of life on Earth, from dinosaurs to fossil invertebrates and reptiles, to large mammals, birds and fish, and the only mounted Kronosaurus. The mineralogical galleries present a systematic display of meteorites, minerals and gemstones. The galleries also house the historic Ware Collection of Blaschka Glass Models of Plants, popularly known as the Glass Flowers, and the exhibit Sea Creatures in Glass, displaying some of the Harvard Museum of Comparative Zoology's collection of the Blaschka models of marine invertebrates. In addition, a series of changing exhibitions bring focus to new research at the University.

Programs
The museum offers educational programs and has a partnership with Cambridge public schools; offers public lectures by Harvard biologists, international conservationists, and popular authors; and has a travel program where small groups are led by Harvard science faculty to biodiverse locations.

Operations
The museum is member-based, with over 3,200 current members, primarily from the Boston metropolitan area. While the museum is affiliated with the Harvard's Faculty of Arts and Sciences and receives important support from the University, it derives most of its operating income from admissions, membership, gifts, and programmatic revenues.

References

Further reading

 Pick, Nancy, & Sloan, Mark. (2004). The Rarest of the Rare: Stories Behind the Treasures at the Harvard Museum of Natural History. Harper. ISBN 978-0060537180

External links
Harvard Museum of Natural History website

Harvard University museums
Natural history museums in Massachusetts
Museums in Cambridge, Massachusetts
Harvard University buildings
University museums in Massachusetts
Museums established in 1998
1998 establishments in Massachusetts
Association of Science-Technology Centers member institutions
Buildings and structures completed in 1859
National Register of Historic Places in Cambridge, Massachusetts
University and college buildings on the National Register of Historic Places in Massachusetts
Brick buildings and structures
Renaissance Revival architecture in Massachusetts